Dorival Knippel (September 28, 1917 – February 15, 1990), nicknamed Yustrich, was a Brazilian goalkeeper of the 1930s and 1940s. His nickname was a reference to fellow goalkeeper Juan Elías Yustrich, then of Boca Juniors, who he was said to resemble.

From 1935 to 1944, he played for Flamengo, but became known at national level as a manager for Atlético Mineiro, Cruzeiro EC, Coritiba, Corinthians, Flamengo as well as FC Porto in Portugal. Yustrich also coached Brazil in a single match in 1968.

Honours

Players 
Flamengo 
 Campeonato Carioca (4): 1939, 1942, 1943, 1944

Manager 
América Mineiro
 Campeonato Mineiro (1): 1948

Atlético Mineiro
 Campeonato Mineiro (2): 1952, 1953

Porto
 Primeira Liga (1): 1955–56 
 Taça de Portugal (1): 1955–56

Siderúrgica
 Campeonato Mineiro (1): 1964

Cruzeiro
 Campeonato Mineiro (1): 1977

References

1917 births
1990 deaths
People from Corumbá
Brazilian people of German descent
Brazilian footballers
Association football goalkeepers
Brazilian football managers
National team coaches
Expatriate football managers in Portugal
CR Flamengo footballers
CR Vasco da Gama players
America Football Club (RJ) players
Clube Atlético Mineiro managers
FC Porto managers
America Football Club (RJ) managers
CR Vasco da Gama managers
Bangu Atlético Clube managers
Brazil national football team managers
CR Flamengo managers
América Futebol Clube (MG) managers
Cruzeiro Esporte Clube managers
Sport Club Corinthians Paulista managers
Coritiba Foot Ball Club managers
Sportspeople from Mato Grosso do Sul